The Norris Almshouses were erected in 1893 on Berridge Road in Sherwood Rise, Nottinghamshire.

They comprise a row of eight one-bedroom houses for Ladies, designed by the architect Fothergill Watson and paid for by Mary Smith Norris (1827-1909) in 1893 in memory of her brother John Norris.

The charity objectives were to provide a residence available for poor widows or spinsters or married couples of not less than 60 years of age resident in the City of Nottingham or within a distance of 6 miles therefrom. Preferences shall be given to persons so qualified who are members of the Church of England or some orthodox Protestant dissenting denomination.

A restoration in 1991  included the manufacture of hand-cut bricks, a terracota dragon for the roof ridge and a specially commissioned weather cock and sundial.

The almshouses are now managed by Nottingham Community Housing Association and the Norris Homes Charity (236206) which formerly managed the properties was wound up in 2008.

References

Almshouses in Nottingham
Grade II listed buildings in Nottinghamshire
Buildings and structures in Nottingham
Residential buildings completed in 1893
Grade II listed almshouses